A municipality is a subdivision of Georgia, consisting of a settlement or a group of settlements (community, თემი, temi), which enjoy local self-government. A total of 69 municipalities are registered as of January 2019. Five municipalities are entirely located in breakaway Abkhazia and South Ossetia, and are effectively not governed by Tbilisi. The remaining 64 are divided over five self-governing cities (ქალაქი, kalaki) and 59 self-governing communities. Municipalities can be subdivided into administrative units, referred to as a community (თემი, temi).

Background 
The municipalities were first established in 2006. Most of them were successors to the earlier subdivisions, known as raioni (რაიონი), "districts". In addition, new municipalities were formed to govern those settlements in the disputed entities of Abkhazia and South Ossetia that at the time remained under Georgia's control. After the Russo-Georgian War of 2008, Georgia treats these municipalities as parts of its occupied territories. The former districts not under Georgia's effective sovereignty at the moment of the local government reform of 2006 were not transformed into municipalities. Rather, the laws of Georgia include a notion that the final mode of subdivision and system of local self-government should be established after the restoration of the state jurisdiction over the occupied territories. Each municipality is divided into administrative units (ადმინისტრაციული ერთეული), which can comprise one or several settlements.

The municipalities outside the two autonomous republics of Adjara and of Abkhazia and the capital city of Tbilisi are grouped, on a provisional basis, into nine regions (mkhare): Guria, Imereti, Kakheti, Kvemo Kartli, Mtskheta-Mtianeti, Racha-Lechkhumi and Kvemo Svaneti, Samegrelo-Zemo Svaneti, Samtskhe-Javakheti, and Shida Kartli.

List of municipalities as of 2019 

a – Territories in Abkhazia or South Ossetia outside of Georgia's control and defined by Georgia as "occupied territories".

b – Temporary administrative-territorial unit, entirely located in South Ossetia or Abkhazia outside of Georgia's control. Defined by Georgia as "occupied territories". Municipal body formally in Tbilisi.

c – Municipalities which include at least some settlements in South Ossetia outside of Georgia's control that are defined by Georgia as "occupied territories".

d – Official statistics available only for those parts of the municipalities that are controlled by Georgia.

e – Official statistics are not available for the territories not under Georgia's control (Abkhazia and South Ossetia).

See also 

 Occupied territories of Georgia

References 

 
Subdivisions of Georgia (country)
Georgia 2
Georgia 2
Georgia 2
Municipalities, Georgia
Georgia (country) geography-related lists
Self-governance